Yokes may refer to:

People with the surname
William J. Yokes (1918–1942), United States Navy sailor for whom a U.S. Navy high-speed transport was named

Ships
 USS Yokes (DE-668), a United States Navy destroyer escort converted during construction into the high-speed transport USS Yokes (APD-69)
 USS Yokes (APD-69), a United States Navy high-speed transport in commission from 1944 to 1946

See also
Yoke
Yoke's Fresh Market, a chain of grocery stores in the United States